St. Mary's Preparatory is a co-educational, Catholic, college preparatory high school with a Polish-American heritage in the Detroit suburb of Orchard Lake Village, Michigan. Its mission and message is "God, Family and St. Mary's."

Overview
St. Mary's was founded in 1885 on Detroit's east side on the corner of Forest and St. Aubin by Rev. Joseph Dabrowski as a school for Polish-American boys to train for the priesthood. The school moved to the 125 acre (0.5 km²) campus of the former Michigan Military Academy on the shores of Orchard Lake in 1909 and is still there today.  St. Mary's offers a college preparatory education.  The campus is shared with SS. Cyril and Methodius Seminary and contains some offices and classrooms for Madonna University of Livonia, Michigan.  The Felician Sisters from Livonia, Michigan have served the Orchard Lake Schools since 1935.  Since 2020, St. Mary's Preparatory opened admissions to girls.

Academics
St. Mary's academic program is designed to meet the basic entrance requirements for any college curriculum.  Requirements for graduation are: four years of theology and English; four years of mathematics; three years of science and social studies; three years of foreign language; and a semester each of computer programming, computer applications, physical education, health, fine arts, and speech. Students are required to fulfill 28 credits for graduation. Over 60% of the 90 different courses offered by St. Mary's Prep from grades 9-12 are at the honors and AP level.

Although students need not be Catholic to attend St. Mary's, all students are educated in the Catholic tradition. This tradition includes four years of theology in the classroom as well as attendance at Mass twice weekly. Class retreats and other activities are available for students. The school chaplain and many campus priests can guide students regarding their individual programs.

100 percent of St. Mary's graduates who apply to college have been accepted. A full-time guidance counselor assists students in selecting colleges and universities. The school held the national record for most students from one year to go to the U.S. Naval Academy (4).

 Students may enjoy walking to classes as the classes are located in different buildings, so the outside walks offer fresh air and scenic views of the campus and Orchard Lake.

St. Mary's Preparatory is fully accredited and licensed by the State of Michigan's Department of Education, the Michigan Non-Public Schools Accrediting Association (MNSAA), and is a member of the Orchard Lake Schools, the Archdiocese of Detroit, the Detroit Catholic League, the Oakland Schools Consortium, and the Michigan High School Athletic Association.

Campus and student life
Campus buildings include a hockey arena, volume library, a Marian grotto, a three-story residence hall, a bookstore, two gymnasiums, a science center, administration buildings, a laboratory and science building, a field house, a dining hall, and the Shrine Chapel. It has a quarter of a mile of beach on Orchard Lake open only to members of the school.

Students often participate in playing sports.  The school offers 14 varsity sports: football, basketball, baseball, bowling, track and field, cross country, golf, wrestling, rowing, hockey, soccer, lacrosse, skiing, and snowboarding. The Girl's Division offers cheerleading, volleyball, basketball, crew, track, and field. The Eaglets have won many league, district, and regional titles in its history.   it had 41 Michigan State Championships. In 1998 the school's rowing team placed second in the Henley Royal Regatta.  The Eaglet football team reached the state finals fourteen times, winning eight times. In 2021, the Eaglet baseball team won the high school baseball National Championship, it was the first time that a team from Michigan had won the National Championship, the Eaglets won it while finishing 43-1 on the season.  

The athletic facilities include an athletic center with a hockey arena, a weight room, an indoor track, locker rooms, a banquet hall, and a basketball gymnasium.  The crew team has its own boathouse just off Orchard Lake.  Outdoors, St. Mary's has two football fields, two baseball diamonds, and a basketball court.  The St. Mary's Ski team practices at Alpine Valley Snow Ski Area in White Lake, Michigan.

The Eaglets compete in the MHSAA Division I (ice hockey), II, and III, depending on the sport.  In the Detroit Catholic League, they compete in the Central Division.  St. Mary's fiercest rivals are De La Salle Collegiate High School, Birmingham Brother Rice, U of D Jesuit, and Catholic Central High School.

St. Mary's holds the largest high school fair in the country every year for fund-raising attracting thousands of people (http://www.stmaryspolishcountryfair.com/).

Museums
The "Ark Building" (#9) contains the Polish Home Army Museum. The Ark Building also houses many other museums of Polish military history and Polish history in different rooms including: Reading Room of the Central-Archives of Polonia; Museum of Fr. Józef Dąbrowski; Museum of the Polish Army Second Corps; Archive and Museum of Polonia Radio and TV, Robert Lewandowski Collection; Commemorative Room of Polish Diaspora; Archive, Library, and Museum of the First Polish Armored Division; Archive, Library, and Museum of the Polish Home Army AK; Archive, Library, and Museum of the Polish Air Force; Museum of the Singers Alliance of America – Circuit 4; Museum of the Polish National Alliance, Aloysius A. Mazewski Collection; Dr. Loda and Edward C. Rózanski Collection; Museum of the Polish Falcons – Nest 31; and the Museum of the Polish Association of Former Political Prisoners.

The Galeria (Building #8) features art by Polish artists, including painting, sculpture, china, and antique furniture.

The Galeria and museums area open for tours on Polish Sundays, the first Sunday of the month.

Boarding program

There are seven-day and five-day boarding students.

Notable former faculty
 Dan Gheesling, Winner of Big Brother 10. Asst. Coach of Football team, & Teacher of Health, Biology, & Physical Education at St. Mary's.
Art Paddy, Michigan High School Football Hall of Fame 1983 / OLSM Varsity football coach 1973-1977

Notable alumni
 Robert Bolden, former Penn State Nittany Lions and LSU Tigers quarterback
 Josh Bourke, a former Canadian football offensive lineman who spent the majority of his professional career with the Montreal Alouettes of the Canadian Football League (CFL)
 David Bowens, a former American football linebacker who played twelve seasons in the National Football League (NFL)
 Charles Davis, a former American football tight end
 K. J. Hamler, a current American football wide receiver for the Denver Broncos of the NFL.
 Gary Ignasiak, a former Major League Baseball (MLB) player who played part of one season with the Detroit Tigers.
 Filmel Johnson, a former American football defensive back who played one season for the Buffalo Bills in the NFL.
 Scott Kowalkowski, a former American football linebacker who played for the Philadelphia Eagles and the Detroit Lions in a ten-year career that lasted from 1991 to 2001 in the NFL.
 Matt Linehan, quarterback for the Salt Lake Stallions in the Alliance of American Football (AAF).
 Kalin Lucas, an American professional basketball player for Hapoel Jerusalem of the Israeli Premier League
 Adam Maida, a cardinal prelate of the Roman Catholic Church
 Grant Mason, a former American football cornerback
 Jim Paciorek, former professional baseball player.
 Jay Penske, a media and publishing businessman
 Jeff Petry, professional ice hockey defenseman currently playing for the Pittsburgh Penguins of the National Hockey League (NHL)
 Leonard Renfro,  former American football defensive tackle who played two seasons for the Philadelphia Eagles in the NFL
 Allen Robinson, a current American football wide receiver for the Los Angeles Rams of the NFL.
 Sam Rogers, a former American football linebacker in the NFL for the Buffalo Bills, the San Diego Chargers, and the Atlanta Falcons
 Dion Sims, an American football tight end for the Chicago Bears of the NFL 
 Morgan Trent, a former American football cornerback in the NFL.

References

External links
 St. Mary's Preparatory - official site
 Athletic website

Catholic secondary schools in Michigan
High schools in Oakland County, Michigan
Educational institutions established in 1885
School buildings on the National Register of Historic Places in Michigan
Polish-American culture in Metro Detroit
Historic district contributing properties in Michigan
Roman Catholic Archdiocese of Detroit
1885 establishments in Michigan
National Register of Historic Places in Oakland County, Michigan